Joseph-Joachim Labrouche (28 July 1769, in Hendaye – 21 March 1853, in Saint-Jean-de-Luz) was a French politician. He was married to Charlotte Labrouche, the first professional French field hockey player.

Labrouche played an important role in the Napoleonic Empire and received the Légion d'Honneur on 25 January 1815.

On 13 May 1815, he was elected a member of the Chambre des Représentants, a short-lived parliamentary assembly set up by Napoleon I during the Hundred Days, for the arrondissement of Bayonne.

Labrouche was also an important ship-owner and a mayor of Saint-Jean-de-Luz.

References
Dictionnaire des parlementaires français (1789-1889).

1769 births
1853 deaths
People from Hendaye
French politicians
Chevaliers of the Légion d'honneur